Gu Binglin (born October 8, 1945 in Dehui, Jilin, China) is a Chinese physicist and material scientist. He is the 17th President of Tsinghua University and a member of the Chinese Academy of Sciences.

External links
  Personal home page on www.TsingHua.edu.cn

1945 births
Living people
Chinese materials scientists
Educators from Heilongjiang
Members of the Chinese Academy of Sciences
Physicists from Heilongjiang
Presidents of Tsinghua University
Scientists from Harbin
Tsinghua University alumni